Stenoma modicola is a moth in the family Depressariidae. It was described by Edward Meyrick in 1911. It is found in the Democratic Republic of the Congo (Katanga), South Africa and Tanzania.

The wingspan is about 24 mm. The forewings are deep ochreous yellow and the hindwings are rather dark grey.

References

Moths described in 1911
Stenoma